Lathan may refer to the following people:

Given name
Lathan McKay, American curator, producer, actor, writer, and entrepreneur
Lathan Moses Stanley Echols, American rapper Lil Mosey

Surname
Christina Lathan (born 1958), East German sprinter 
Corinna E. Lathan, American engineer and businesswoman
Dwayne Lathan (born 1989), American basketball player 
George Lathan (1875–1942), British trade unionist and politician 
Raymond Lee Lathan, American politician
Sanaa Lathan (born 1971), American actress and voice actress 
Stan Lathan (born 1945), American television and film director and television producer 
Terry Lathan, American school teacher and political activist 
Trayvon Lathan (born 1984), American basketball player

See also
 Lathon